Marcos Antônio da Silva Gonçalves (born 17 October 1989 in Prado, Bahia), commonly known as Marquinhos, is a Brazilian professional footballer who plays as a winger for CSA.

Club career
In 2008, Marquinhos was discovered in Vitória's youth squads and made his debut in the Campeonato Baiano. Later, on the Campeonato Brasileiro, he was considered to be one of the best young players of the season; playing almost every game in the first team despite being only 18 years of age.

In November 2020, Marquinhos joined Hong Kong Premier League club Pegasus.

Career statistics

Club
(Correct )

according to combined sources on footballzz.co.uk, Flamengo official website and Flaestatística.

Honours
Vitória
Bahia State Championship: 2008, 2013

Flamengo
Taça Guanabara: 2011
Taça Rio: 2011
Rio de Janeiro State League: 2011

Cruzeiro
Campeonato Brasileiro Série A: 2014

References

External links

1989 births
Living people
Brazilian footballers
Association football midfielders
Association football forwards
Campeonato Brasileiro Série A players
Campeonato Brasileiro Série B players
Hong Kong Premier League players
Esporte Clube Vitória players
Sociedade Esportiva Palmeiras players
CR Flamengo footballers
Desportivo Brasil players
Cruzeiro Esporte Clube players
Sport Club Internacional players
Sport Club do Recife players
América Futebol Clube (MG) players
TSW Pegasus FC players
Expatriate footballers in Hong Kong
Brazilian expatriate sportspeople in Hong Kong